100 Diagrams That Changed The World: From The Earliest Cave Paintings to the Innovation of the iPod is a book by journalist Scott Christianson. The book compiles 1000 diagrams throughout history considered by the author to be particularly influential.

See also 
Diagrams and Explanations of the Wonderful Machines of the Far West

References 

2012 non-fiction books
Plume (publisher) books